Namgwangju station ("South Gwangju station") is a station on Gwangju Metro Line 1, located at Hak-dong 994 in Dong-gu, Gwangju, South Korea. It opened for service on April 28, 2004.

It lies at the site of the former Korail Namgwangju station, which had opened as Singwangju station in 1936 and been renamed Namgwangju in 1938. That station was closed in 2000 as part of the realignment of the Gyeongjeon Line.

Neighborhood
Namgwangju is historically a transportation hub and the gateway to southern Gwangju and Hwasun-gun (county), including the routes to Jeungsimsa Temple and Mudeungsan. The station serves the commercial district surrounding the South Gwangju General Market (Namgwangju Market), which opened in 1975 to serve the Yeosu, Boseong, and Jangheung areas.

Traffic in this area tends to be jammed during rush hours as educational institutions, including Jeonnam Medical School, Chosun University, and Chosun College of Nursing; and governmental and public offices such as the Military Manpower Administration and the Dong-gu government office; are clustered around this station.

Station layout

See also
 Transportation in South Korea

References

External links

Gwangju Metropolitan Rapid Transit Corporation in English
Route Map in Korean

Railway stations opened in 2004
Dong District, Gwangju
Gwangju Metro stations